Prescott and Russell was an electoral riding in Ontario, Canada. It existed from 1967 to 1999, when it was abolished into Glengarry—Prescott—Russell and Ottawa—Orléans when ridings were redistributed to match their federal counterparts. It consisted of the United Counties of Prescott and Russell as well as the Township of Cumberland.

Members of Provincial Parliament

Election results

References

Former provincial electoral districts of Ontario